Bartholomew Leahy Lynch (born 1830 in County Limerick, Ireland) was an educator, lawyer, and the first Republican Attorney General of Louisiana, serving from 1865 to 1867 during the Reconstruction Era. Lynch emigrated from Ireland in 1851 and settled near Alexandria, Louisiana. He served as a lieutenant in the Louisiana State Militia after Louisiana seceded from the Union, though he claimed he was forced into service. Although he later voluntarily accepted a commission from the governor of Confederate Louisiana, he claimed to have never believed in the cause of the Confederacy. In February 1864, Lynch was elected as Attorney General of Union-controlled "Free Louisiana" on the Moderate Republican ticket.

References 

1830 births
Louisiana Attorneys General
Republican Party (United States) politicians
People of Louisiana in the American Civil War
People of the Reconstruction Era
Year of death missing
Irish emigrants to the United States (before 1923)